"Blind" is a song recorded by French DJ and producer Feder featuring the vocals of Emmi. The song was released as a digital download in France on 20 November 2015 through Time Records and Warner Music.

Music video
A music video to accompany the release of "Blind" was first released onto YouTube on 10 December 2015 at a total length of three minutes and twenty-four seconds.

Track listing

Chart performance

Weekly charts

Year-end charts

Release history

References

2016 singles
2015 songs